Amblycoleus is a genus of beetles in the family Carabidae, containing the following species:

 Amblycoleus douei Chaudoir, 1872
 Amblycoleus peruanus Liebke, 1928
 Amblycoleus platyderus (Chaudoir, 1861)
 Amblycoleus pluriseriatus (Chaudoir, 1877)

References

Ctenodactylinae